The Lost Weekend is an album by the American duo Danny & Dusty, released in 1985 by A&M Records. Danny is Dan Stuart from the band Green on Red and Dusty is Steve Wynn from the band the Dream Syndicate. Their backing band featured members of Green on Red, the Dream Syndicate and the Long Ryders.

Track listing 
All songs written by Dan Stuart and Steve Wynn except where noted.

Side one:
 "The Word Is Out" – 3:57
 "Song for the Dreamers" – 5:05
 "Miracle Mile" – 4:20
 "Baby, We All Gotta Go Down" – 4:17

Side two:
 "The King of the Losers" – 6:10
 "Send Me a Postcard" – 2:55
 "Down to the Bone" – 6:20
 "Knockin' on Heaven's Door" (Bob Dylan) – 5:41

CD bonus track:
 "Bend in the Road" 4:10

"The Word Is Out" and "Bend in the Road" were recorded in February 1984 and produced by Rick Novak.

Personnel 
Danny & Dusty
 Dan Stuart – lead vocals
 Steve Wynn – lead vocals, guitar
with:
 Sid Griffin – guitar, dobro, vocals
 Stephen McCarthy – guitar, lap steel, vocals
 Tom Stevens – bass guitar
 Chris Cacavas – piano
 Dennis Duck (Dennis Mehaffey) – drums, vocals
Technical
Rick Novak - engineer
Donald Krieger - art direction, design
Dennis Mehaffey, Weinzweig - cover concept
Amy McMillan, Howard Rosenberg - photography

"Special thanks to Jack Waterson, Alex MacNicol, Chuck Prophet IV, Greg Sowders, Mark Walton, Susie Wrenn, Johnette and bartender Bob Breedon from Bob's Frolic Room (Hollywood)."

References

External links 
 

1985 debut albums
Cowpunk albums
A&M Records albums